Alexander Charles Mutch (31 March 1889 – 30 May 1960) was an Australian rules footballer and umpire who played with Collingwood in the VFL during the 1910s and early 1920s. He was also known as Alex Mutch.

A defender who was used mainly in the back pocket, Mutch made his VFL debut in the same game as future Hall of Famer Dan Minogue. He was a member of Collingwood's 1917 premiership team and was one of the 'Best on Ground' in another Grand Final win two years later.

He later umpired 47 VFL games between 1923-27 which included three finals and one grand final.

References

Holmesby, Russell and Main, Jim (2007). The Encyclopedia of AFL Footballers. 7th ed. Melbourne: Bas Publishing.

1889 births
Australian rules footballers from Melbourne
Collingwood Football Club players
Collingwood Football Club Premiership players
Australian Football League umpires
1960 deaths
Two-time VFL/AFL Premiership players
People from Collingwood, Victoria